Jonas Björkman and Max Mirnyi were the defending champions and successfully defended their title, defeating Bob and Mike Bryan 3–6, 6–3, [10–7] in the final.

Seeds
All seeds received a bye into the second round.

Draw

Finals

Top half

Bottom half

External links
 Main Draw

Doubles